The Apotheosis of Washington is the fresco painted by Greek-Italian artist Constantino Brumidi in 1865 and visible through the oculus of the dome in the rotunda of the United States Capitol Building. The dome was completed in 1863, and Brumidi painted it over the course of 11 months at the end of the Civil War. He was paid $40,000 ($ in today's funds) for the fresco.

Brumidi had worked for three years in the Vatican under Pope Gregory XVI, and served several aristocrats as an artist for palaces and villas, including the prince Torlonia. He immigrated to the United States in 1852, and spent much of the last 25 years of his life working in the Capitol. In addition to The Apotheosis of Washington he designed the Brumidi Corridors.

Symbolism

The Apotheosis of Washington depicts George Washington sitting among the heavens in an exalted manner, or in literary terms, ascending and becoming a god (apotheosis). Washington, the first U.S. president and commander-in-chief of the Continental Army during the American Revolutionary War, is allegorically represented, surrounded by figures from classical mythology. Washington is draped in purple, worn by generals of the ancient Roman Republic during their triumphs, with a rainbow arch at his feet, flanked by the goddess Victoria (draped in green, using a horn) to his left and the goddess of Liberty to his right. Liberty wears a red liberty cap, symbolizing emancipation, from a Roman tradition where slaves being manumitted would be given a felt cap (Latin pileus). She holds a fasces in her right hand and an open book in the other, to which Washington gestures with his right hand.

Forming a circle between Liberty and Victory are 13 maidens, each with a star above her head, representing the original 13 colonies. Several of the maidens have their backs turned to Washington, said to represent the colonies that had seceded from the Union at the time of painting. Across the circle from Washington is the banner E Pluribus Unum meaning "out of many, one".

Surrounding Washington, the two goddesses and the 13 maidens are six scenes lining the perimeter, each representing a national concept allegorically: from directly below Washington in the center and moving clockwise, "War," "Science," "Marine," "Commerce," "Mechanics," and "Agriculture". The perimeter scenes are not fully visible from the floor of the Capitol.

See also 
 American civil religion
 Apotheosis
 Panthéon, Paris – building with a dome fresco titled The Apotheosis of Saint Genevieve
 George Washington (Greenough)

References

External links

The Apotheosis of Washington, Architect of the Capitol.
The Apotheosis of George Washington : Brumidi's fresco & Beyond, The University of Virginia.
The Telegraph Field : Valentia Island, Ireland.
 Figure 49. Study for the Apotheosis of George Washington, c. 1863 (photo), 
apotheosisofwashington.com, dedicated website with interactive panorama view
Presidents Day and the Apotheosis of Washington, Online Library of Liberty

George Washington in art
1865 paintings
Paintings in the United States Capitol
Fresco paintings in the United States
Birds in art
Horses in art
American paintings
Religion and society in the United States
Musical instruments in art
Rainbows in art
Neptune (mythology)
Mercury (mythology)
Paintings of Minerva
Paintings of goddesses
Paintings of gods
Ceres